Peter Fernandez (January 29, 1927 – July 15, 2010) was an American actor, voice director, and writer. Despite a career extending from the 1930s, he is probably best known for his roles in the 1967 anime Speed Racer. Fernandez co-wrote the scripts, was the voice director, and translated the English-language version of the theme song. He was instrumental in introducing many Japanese anime series to English-speaking audiences. He is also the narrator in the audio version of It Looked Like Spilt Milk.

Life and career 
Born in Manhattan, New York, one of three children to Pedro and Edna Fernandez. His two siblings were Edward and Jacqueline. He was of Cuban, Irish, and French descent. Fernandez was a child model for the John Robert Power Agency to support his family during the Great Depression. He then appeared on both radio and Broadway, appearing in Lillian Hellman's Watch on the Rhine in 1941. He was drafted into the United States Army at age 18, late in World War II. His radio appearances included roles on Mr. District Attorney, Let's Pretend, Gangbusters, My Best Girls, Superman, and Suspense, as well as soap operas. After his discharge from the Army in 1946, he became a prolific writer for both radio and pulp fiction. He authored the children's book, Bedtime Stories from the Bible.

Fernandez is known for his voice work, and has been heard in English adaptions of many foreign films. Fernandez is best known as the American voice of the title character—and his brother, Racer X—in the 1967 anime series Speed Racer. Besides acting in Speed Racer, he was the lyricist of English version of that show's theme song. He returned in the 2008 animated series Speed Racer: The Next Generation to play a middle-aged Headmaster Spritle. In the live-action 2008 film Speed Racer, Fernandez had a small part as a racing announcer. The rapid-fire delivery of dialogue made famous by Speed Racer was devised by Fernandez and his American voice co-stars in order to make the dialogue jibe with the original Japanese mouth movements.

He provided the voice for Benton Tarantella, a resurrected film director for Courage the Cowardly Dog, which he has said was his favorite. He made cameos credited as "additional characters" in several episodes, besides his role as the voice of Robot Randy. He was a voice director for Robert Mandell's Adventures of the Galaxy Rangers and Princess Gwenevere and the Jewel Riders. Additional voice acting credits include in such dubbed anime titles as Astro Boy, Gigantor, Marine Boy, Star Blazers and Superbook.

In 2007, he was awarded The Special American Anime Award for Outstanding Achievement. Fernandez was interviewed in 2008 on his activities and voice over work. His last major public appearance was at the 2009 Seattle, Washington Sakura-Con.

Personal life and death 

Fernandez lived in Pomona, New York with his wife, Noel Smith, whom he married in 1978; together they had three children.

He died on July 15, 2010, after a battle with lung cancer at the age of 83.

Filmography

Live-action 
Captain Video and His Video Rangers
City Across the River – Frank Cusack
Pulitzer Prize Playhouse
Suspense – Miguel
Leave It to Papa – Son
Armstrong Circle Theatre
Speed Racer – Race Commentator
Kraft Theatre – Harry
Joseph Schildkraut Presents
Macbeth – Donalbain
Crunch and Des
I Spy

Japanese animation dubbing 
 Astro Boy
 Gigantor – Buttons Brilliant, Johnny
 Kuro Kami: the Animation – Ryuujin Nagamine
 Marine Boy – Dr. Mariner, Piper
 Speed Racer – Speed Racer, Racer X, Additional Voices
 Star Blazers: The Bolar Wars – Mark Venture
 Superbook – Additional Voices
 Thunderbirds 2086 – Additional Voices

American animation 
 Ace Ventura: Pet Detective – Additional Voices
 Courage the Cowardly Dog – Benton Tarantella, Robot Randy, the Magic Tree of Nowhere
 Kenny the Shark – Additional Voices
 Princess Gwenevere and the Jewel Riders – Max, Grimm the Dragon
 Speed Racer: The Next Generation – Headmaster Spritle, Speed Racer Sr.

Film 
 Alakazam the Great – Alakazam (speaking voice)
 The Enchanted Journey
 Godzilla versus the Sea Monster – Ryota
 Plan Bee – Bellza
 Planet of Storms
 Planet of the Vampires
 Son of Godzilla – Goro
 Godzilla vs. the Smog Monster – Yukio
 Spider's Web: A Pig's Tale – Noiman Ja Rahr
 What's Eating Gilbert Grape – ADR Voice

Video games 
 The Longest Journey – Elder Banda, Minstrum Yerin, Old Alatien man

Other works 
 Peter Absolute on the Erie Canal (Audio Book Serial)
 Speed Racer (Theme Song Lyrics)
 X-Minus One (Radio Series)
 Baby Animals Just Want to Have Fun (VHS)
 It Looked Like Spilt Milk (Audio Book on Cassette and Disc)

Staff

Dialogue direction 
 Blood Link (1982)
 Bonheur d'occasion (1983)
 A Question of Silence (1982)
 Infra-Man (1976)
 Ingenjör Andrées luftfärd (1982)
 Kenny the Shark (TV series, 2003, episodes 1-13)
 La Diagonale du fou (1984)
 Ultraman (1966)
 Strange Shadows in an Empty Room (1976)

Direction 
 Coup de tête (1979, uncredited)
  (TV, 1999, uncredited)
 The Enchanted Journey (1984, uncredited)

Dubbing direction 
 Nattens engel (1998)

Voice direction 
 2019, After the Fall of New York (1983)
 Ace Ventura: Pet Detective (TV series, 1996, episodes 27-41)
 Al Andalus (1989)
 The Antichrist (1974)
 Assassination in Rome (1965)
 Au nom de tous les miens (1983)
 Au nom de tous les miens (TV miniseries, 1985)
 Bidaya wa nihaya (1960)
 The Black Corsair (1976)
 Bordella (1976, uncredited)
 Choice of Arms (1981)
 Christmas in Cartoontown (UAV, 1996)
 Ciske de Rat (1984, uncredited)
 Coup de torchon (1981)
 Courage the Cowardly Dog (TV series, 1999)
 The Desert of the Tartars (1976)
 Dogs of Hell (1982)
 Fei zhou chao ren (1994)
 Gandahar (1988)
 Goha (1958)
 Gojira-Ebira-Mosura: Nankai no daiketto (1966, Eng. title: Godzilla versus the Sea Monster)
 Infra-Man (1976)
 Jalna (TV miniseries)|Jalna (TV miniseries, 1994)
 Jung-Gwok chiu-yan (1975)
 Kokusai himitsu keisatsu: Zettai zetsumi (1967)
 Le Grand pardon (1982)
 Love and Anarchy (1973)
 Les Chevaliers du ciel (TV series, 1967)
 The Magic Snowman (1988)
 Mimì metallurgico ferito nell'onore (1972, uncredited)
 The Nest (1979)
 Nuovo cinema Paradiso (1989)
 Onna hissatsu ken (1974)
 Piedone a Hong Kong (1975)
 Princess Gwenevere and the Jewel Riders (TV series, 1995)
 Puss 'N Boots Travels Around the World (1976)
 Satsujin ken 2 (1974)
 Shaka (1961)
 Stavisky... (1974, uncredited)
 That Man from Rio (1964)
 The Adventures of the Galaxy Rangers (TV series, 1986)
 The Secret of Anastasia (OAV, 1997)
 The Secret of Mulan (OAV, 1998)
 The Space Giants (TV series, 1967)
 Topâzu (1992)
 Tutto a posto e niente in ordine (1973)
 Un amour de Swann (1984)
 Un moment d'égarement (1977)
 Une histoire simple (1978)
 Vabank (1981)

Writing 
 2019 – Dopo la caduta di New York (1983, uncredited)
 Al Andalus (1989, uncredited)
 Au nom de tous les miens (1983, uncredited)
 Ciske de Rat (1984, uncredited)
 Coup de tête (1979, uncredited)
 Coup de tchon (1981, uncredited)
 El Nido (1979, uncredited)
 Faire l'amur – Emmanuelle et ses soeurs" (1971)
 Fei zhou chao ren (1994, uncredited)
 Gandahar (1988, uncredited)
 Gojira-Ebira-Mosura: Nankai no daiketto (1966, Eng. title: Godzilla versus the Sea Monster, uncredited)
 Infra-Man (1976)
 Il Deserto dei Tartari (1976, uncredited)
 Ingenjör Andrées luftfärd (1982, uncredited)
 Jalna (TV miniseries, 1994, uncredited)
 Le Choix des armes (1981, uncredited)
 Le Grand prdon (1982, uncredited)
 Les Chevaliers du ciel (TV series, 1967, uncredited)
 Mélodie en sous-sol (1963, uncredited)
 Mimì metallurgico ferito nell'onore (1972, uncredited)
 Nattens engel (1998, uncredited)
 Onna hissatsu ken (1974, uncredited)
 Puss 'N Boots Travels Around the World (1976)
 Satsujin ken 2 (1974, uncredited)
  (TV, 1999, uncredited)
 Stavisky... (1974, uncredited)
 Tatsu no ko Tarô (1979, uncredited)
 The Alley Cats (1968)
 The Dirty Girls (1964)
 The Enchanted Journey (1984)
 The Mad Doctor Hump (1969)
 The Night the Animals Talked (1970)
 The Space Giants (TV series, 1967, uncredited)
 Topâzu (1992, uncredited)
 Ultraman (TV series, 1966)
 Une histoire simple
 Un moment d'égarement
 Un amour de Swann
 Woof! (1989)

References

External links 
Recent commercial voice work by Fernandez

Peter Fernandez's interview at Otakon 2008

1927 births
2010 deaths
American child models
American male child actors
American male radio actors
American male screenwriters
American male stage actors
American male television writers
American male video game actors
American male voice actors
American male writers
American people of Cuban descent
American people of French descent
American people of Irish descent
Deaths from lung cancer in New York (state)
Hispanic and Latino American male actors
Male actors from New York City
People from Pomona, New York
Screenwriters from New York (state)
United States Army personnel of World War II
American voice directors